Balin may refer to:

People
Carole B. Balin, American Reform rabbi, professor of Jewish history
Ina Balin (1937–1990), American actress
Marty Balin (1942–2018), American musician
Mireille Balin (1911–1968), French actress
"El Balin", nickname of Honduran soccer player Eduardo Bennett

Places
Balin, Iran, a village in Kermanshah Province, Iran
Balin, East Azerbaijan, a village in East Azerbaijan Province, Iran
Balin, Inowrocław County in Kuyavian-Pomeranian Voivodeship, Poland
Balin, Rypin County in Kuyavian-Pomeranian Voivodeship, Poland
Balin, Łódź Voivodeship, Poland
Balin, Lesser Poland Voivodeship, Poland

Other uses
Balin (album), by Marty Balin
Balin (Middle-earth), a dwarf in J. R. R. Tolkien's legendarium of Middle-earth
Sir Balin, a knight in the legend of King Arthur
 Balin, an alternative form of Bali, a name of various mythological and historical figures of India

See also
Baline
Balinese (disambiguation)
Baling District, Kedah, Malaysia
Balinge, a town in Drenthe, Netherlands
Ballin (disambiguation)